Don Giovanni (K. 527; Vienna (1788) title: , literally The Rake Punished, or Don Giovanni) is an opera in two acts with music by Wolfgang Amadeus Mozart to an Italian libretto by Lorenzo Da Ponte. Its subject is a centuries-old Spanish legend about a libertine as told by playwright Tirso de Molina in his 1630 play El burlador de Sevilla y convidado de piedra. It is a dramma giocoso blending comedy, melodrama and supernatural elements (although the composer entered it into his catalogue simply as opera buffa). It was premiered by the Prague Italian opera at the National Theater (of Bohemia), now called the Estates Theatre, on 29 October 1787. Don Giovanni is regarded as one of the greatest operas of all time and has proved a fruitful subject for commentary in its own right; critic Fiona Maddocks has described it as one of Mozart's "trio of masterpieces with librettos by Da Ponte".

Composition and premiere 

The opera was commissioned after the success of Mozart's trip to Prague in January and February 1787. The subject may have been chosen because the sub-genre of Don Juan opera had originated in that city. Lorenzo Da Ponte's libretto is based on Giovanni Bertati's for the opera Don Giovanni Tenorio, which premiered in Venice early in 1787. In two aspects he copied Bertati: by opening with the Commendatore's murder and by avoiding mention of Seville (for Bertati the setting was Villena, Spain; Da Ponte simply writes "city in Spain").

The opera was supposed to premiere on 14 October 1787 for Archduchess Maria Theresa of Austria’s visit, but it was not ready in time and Le nozze di Figaro was substituted. Mozart recorded its completion, finally, on 28 October, the night before the premiere (29 October).

The opera was rapturously received, as was often true of Mozart's work in Prague. The Prager Oberpostamtzeitung reported, "Connoisseurs and musicians say that Prague has never heard the like", and "the opera ... is extremely difficult to perform." The Provincialnachrichten of Vienna reported, "Herr Mozart conducted in person and was welcomed joyously and jubilantly by the numerous gathering."

Scoring
The score calls for double woodwinds, two horns, two trumpets, three trombones (alto, tenor, bass), timpani, basso continuo for the recitatives, and the usual string section. The composer also specified occasional special musical effects. For the ballroom scene at the end of the first act, Mozart calls for two onstage ensembles to play separate dance music in synchronization with the pit orchestra, each of the three groups playing in its own metre (a 3/4 minuet, a 2/4 contradanse and a fast 3/8 peasant dance), accompanying the dancing of the principal characters. In act 2, Giovanni is seen to play the mandolin, accompanied by pizzicato strings. In the same act, two of the Commendatore's interventions ("" and "") are accompanied by a wind chorale of oboes, clarinets, bassoons, and trombones (with cellos and basses playing from the string section).

Revision for Vienna

Mozart also supervised the Vienna premiere of the work, which took place on 7 May 1788. For this production, he wrote two new arias with corresponding recitatives – Don Ottavio's aria "" (K. 540a, composed on 24 April for the tenor Francesco Morella), Elvira's aria "" (K. 540c, composed on 30 April for the soprano Caterina Cavalieri) – and the duet between Leporello and Zerlina "" (K. 540b, composed on 28 April). He also made some cuts in the Finale in order to make it shorter and more incisive, the most important of which is the section where Anna and Ottavio, Elvira, Zerlina and Masetto, Leporello reveal their plans for the future (""). In order to connect "" ("It must have been the ghost she met") directly to the moral of the story "" ("This is the end which befalls to evildoers"), Mozart composed a different version of "" ("So the wretch can stay down there with Proserpina and Pluto!"). These cuts are very seldom performed in theatres or recordings.

Later performance traditions 
The opera's final ensemble was generally omitted until the early 20th century, a tradition that apparently began very early on. According to the 19th-century Bohemian memoirist Wilhelm Kuhe, the final ensemble was only presented at the very first performance in Prague, then never heard again during the original run. It does not appear in the Viennese libretto of 1788; thus the ending of the first performance in Vienna without the ensemble as depicted in the film Amadeus may be an accurate portrayal. Nonetheless, the final ensemble is almost invariably performed in full today.

Modern productions sometimes include both the original aria for Don Ottavio, "", and its replacement from the first production in Vienna that was crafted to suit the capabilities of the tenor Francesco Morella, "". Elvira's "" is usually retained as well. The duet "" and the whole accompanying scene involving Zerlina and Leporello from the Viennese version is almost never included.

Although the same singer played both Masetto and the Commendatore roles in both the Prague and Vienna premieres, in modern-day productions, the roles are typically taken by different singers (unless limited by such things as finance or rehearsal time and space). The final scene's chorus of demons after the Commendatore's exit gives the singer time for a costume change before entering as Masetto for the sextet, though not much time.

Roles

Instrumentation 
The instrumentation is:
 Woodwinds: two flutes, two oboes, two clarinets and two bassoons
 Brass: two horns, two trumpets, three trombones
 Percussion: timpani
 Strings: first violins, second violins, violas, cellos and double basses
 Basso continuo in secco recitatives of harpsichord and violoncello (period performance practice often uses a fortepiano only)
 Mandolin

Synopsis 

Don Giovanni, a young, arrogant, and sexually promiscuous nobleman, abuses and outrages everyone else in the cast until he encounters something he cannot kill, beat up, dodge, or outwit.

Act 1 

The overture begins with a thundering D minor cadence, followed by a short  sequence which leads into a light-hearted D major allegro.

The garden of the Commendatore
Leporello, Don Giovanni's servant, grumbles about his demanding master and daydreams about being free of him ("" – "Night and day I slave away"). He is keeping watch while Don Giovanni is in the Commendatore's house attempting to seduce or rape the Commendatore's daughter, Donna Anna. Don Giovanni enters the garden from inside the house, pursued by Donna Anna. Don Giovanni is masked and Donna Anna tries to hold him and to unmask him, shouting for help. (Trio: "" – "Do not hope, unless you kill me, that I shall ever let you run away!"). He breaks free and she runs off as the Commendatore enters the garden. The Commendatore blocks Don Giovanni's path and forces him to fight a duel. Don Giovanni kills the Commendatore with his sword and escapes with Leporello. Donna Anna, returning with her fiancé, Don Ottavio, is horrified to see her father lying dead in a pool of his own blood. She makes Don Ottavio swear vengeance against the unknown murderer. (Duet: "" – "Ah, swear to avenge that blood if you can!")

A public square outside Don Giovanni's palace

Leporello tells Don Giovanni that he (Giovanni) is leading a rotten life; Don Giovanni reacts angrily. They hear a woman (Donna Elvira) singing of having been abandoned by her lover, on whom she is seeking revenge ("" – "Ah, who could ever tell me"). Don Giovanni starts to flirt with her, but it turns out he is the former lover she is seeking. The two recognize each other and she reproaches him bitterly. He shoves Leporello forward, ordering him to tell Donna Elvira the truth about him, and then hurries away.

Leporello tells Donna Elvira that Don Giovanni is not worth her feelings for him. He is unfaithful to everyone; his conquests include 640 women and girls in Italy, 231 in Germany, 100 in France, 91 in Turkey, but in Spain, 1,003 ("Madamina, il catalogo è questo" – "My dear lady, this is the catalogue"). In a frequently cut recitative, Donna Elvira vows vengeance.

The open country

A marriage procession with Masetto and Zerlina enters. Don Giovanni and Leporello arrive soon after. Don Giovanni is immediately attracted to Zerlina, and he attempts to remove the jealous Masetto by offering to host a wedding celebration at his castle. On realizing that Don Giovanni means to remain behind with Zerlina, Masetto becomes angry ("" – "I understand! Yes, my lord!") but is forced to leave. Don Giovanni and Zerlina are soon alone and he immediately begins his seductive arts (Duet: "Là ci darem la mano" – "There we will entwine our hands").

Donna Elvira arrives and thwarts the seduction ("" – "Flee from the traitor!"). She leaves with Zerlina. Don Ottavio and Donna Anna enter, plotting vengeance on the still unknown murderer of Donna Anna's father. Donna Anna, unaware that she is speaking to her attacker, pleads for Don Giovanni's help. Don Giovanni, relieved that he is unrecognised, readily promises it, and asks who has disturbed her peace. Before she can answer, Donna Elvira returns and tells Donna Anna and Don Ottavio that Don Giovanni is a false-hearted seducer. Don Giovanni tries to convince Don Ottavio and Donna Anna that Donna Elvira is insane (Quartet: "" – "Don't trust him, oh sad one"). As Don Giovanni leaves, Donna Anna suddenly recognizes him as her father's murderer and tells Don Ottavio the story of his intrusion, claiming that she was deceived at first because she was expecting a night visit from Don Ottavio himself, but managed to fight Don Giovanni off after discovering the impostor (long recitative exchange between Donna Anna and Don Ottavio). She repeats her demand that he avenge her and points out that he will be avenging himself as well (aria: "Or sai chi l'onore Rapire a me volse" – "Now you know who wanted to rob me of my honour"). In the Vienna version, Don Ottavio, not yet convinced (Donna Anna having only recognised Don Giovanni's voice, not seen his face), resolves to keep an eye on his friend ("" – "On her peace my peace depends").

Leporello informs Don Giovanni that all the guests of the peasant wedding are in Don Giovanni's house and that he distracted Masetto from his jealousy, but that Zerlina, returning with Donna Elvira, made a scene and spoiled everything. However, Don Giovanni remains cheerful and tells Leporello to organize a party and invite every girl he can find. (Don Giovanni's "Champagne Aria": "" – "Till they are tipsy"). They hasten to his palace.

A garden outside Don Giovanni's palace

Zerlina follows the jealous Masetto and tries to pacify him ("" – "Beat, O beat me, handsome Masetto"), but just as she manages to persuade him of her innocence, Don Giovanni's voice from offstage startles and frightens her. Masetto hides, resolving to see for himself what Zerlina will do when Don Giovanni arrives. Zerlina tries to hide from Don Giovanni, but he finds her and attempts to continue the seduction, until he stumbles upon Masetto's hiding place. Confused but quickly recovering, Don Giovanni reproaches Masetto for leaving Zerlina alone, and returns her temporarily to him. Don Giovanni then leads both offstage to his ballroom. Three masked guests – the disguised Don Ottavio, Donna Anna, and Donna Elvira – enter the garden. From a balcony, Leporello invites them to his master's party. They accept the invitation and Leporello leaves the balcony. Alone, Don Ottavio and Donna Anna pray for protection, Donna Elvira for vengeance (Trio: "" – "May the just heavens protect us").

Don Giovanni's ballroom

As the merriment, featuring three separate chamber orchestras on stage, proceeds, Leporello distracts Masetto by dancing with him, while Don Giovanni leads Zerlina offstage to a private room and tries to assault her. When Zerlina screams for help, Don Giovanni drags Leporello onstage from the room, accuses Leporello of assaulting Zerlina himself, and threatens to kill him. The others are not fooled. Don Ottavio produces a pistol and points it at Don Giovanni, and the three guests unmask and declare that they know all. But despite being denounced and menaced from all sides, Don Giovanni remains calm and escapes – for the moment.

Act 2 
Outside Donna Elvira's house

Leporello threatens to leave Don Giovanni, but his master calms him with a peace offering of money (Duet: "Eh via buffone" – "Go on, fool"). Wanting to seduce Donna Elvira's maid, and believing that she will trust him better if he appears in lower-class clothes, Don Giovanni orders Leporello to exchange cloak and hat with him. Donna Elvira comes to her window (Trio: "Ah taci, ingiusto core" – "Ah, be quiet unjust heart"). Seeing an opportunity for a game, Don Giovanni hides and sends Leporello out in the open wearing Don Giovanni's cloak and hat. From his hiding place Don Giovanni sings a promise of repentance, expressing a desire to return to her and threatening to kill himself if she does not take him back, while Leporello poses as Don Giovanni and tries to keep from laughing. Donna Elvira, convinced, descends to the street. Leporello, continuing to pose as Don Giovanni, leads her away to keep her occupied while Don Giovanni serenades her maid with his mandolin. ("Deh, vieni alla finestra" – "Ah, come to the window").

Before Don Giovanni can complete his seduction of the maid, Masetto and his friends arrive, looking for Don Giovanni in order to kill him. Don Giovanni poses as Leporello (whose clothes he is still wearing) and joins the posse, pretending that he also hates Don Giovanni. After cunningly dispersing Masetto's friends (Don Giovanni aria: "Metà di voi qua vadano" – "Half of you go this way. the others, go that way"), Don Giovanni takes Masetto's weapons away, beats him up, and runs off, laughing. Zerlina arrives and consoles the bruised and battered Masetto ("Vedrai carino" – "You'll see, dear one").

A dark courtyard

Leporello abandons Donna Elvira. (Sextet: "Sola, sola in buio loco" – "All alone in this dark place"). As he tries to escape, he bumps into Don Ottavio and Donna Anna. Zerlina and Masetto also enter the scene. Everyone mistakes Leporello for Don Giovanni, whose clothes he is still wearing. They surround Leporello and threaten to kill him. Donna Elvira tries to protect the man who she thinks is Don Giovanni, claiming him as her husband and begging the others to spare him. Leporello takes off Don Giovanni's cloak and reveals his true identity. He begs for mercy and, seeing an opportunity, runs off (Leporello aria: "Ah pietà signori miei" – "Ah, have mercy, my lords"). Don Ottavio is now convinced that Don Giovanni murdered Donna Anna's father (the deceased Commendatore). He swears vengeance ("Il mio tesoro" – "My treasure" – though in the Vienna version this was cut).

In the Vienna production of the opera, Zerlina follows Leporello and recaptures him. Threatening him with a razor, she ties him to a stool. He attempts to sweet-talk her out of hurting him. (Duet: "Per queste tue manine" – "For these hands of yours"). Zerlina goes to find Masetto and the others; Leporello escapes again before she returns. This scene, marked by low comedy, is rarely performed today. Also in the Vienna production, Donna Elvira is still furious at Don Giovanni for betraying her, but she also feels sorry for him. ("Mi tradì quell'alma ingrata" – "That ungrateful wretch betrayed me").

A graveyard with the statue of the Commendatore
Don Giovanni wanders into a graveyard. Leporello happens along and the two reunite. Leporello tells Don Giovanni of his brush with danger, and Don Giovanni laughingly taunts him, saying that he took advantage of his disguise as Leporello by trying to seduce one of Leporello's girlfriends. The voice of the statue interrupts and warns Don Giovanni that his laughter will not last beyond sunrise. At the command of his master, Leporello reads the inscription upon the statue's base: "Here am I waiting for revenge against the scoundrel who killed me" ("Dell'empio che mi trasse al passo estremo qui attendo la vendetta"). The servant trembles, but Don Giovanni scornfully orders him to invite the statue to dinner, and threatens to kill him if he does not. Leporello makes several attempts to invite the statue to dinner, but is too frightened to complete the invitation (Duet: "O, statua gentilissima" – "Oh most noble statue"). Don Giovanni invites the statue to dinner himself. Much to his surprise, the statue nods its head and responds affirmatively.

Donna Anna's room
Don Ottavio pressures Donna Anna to marry him, but she thinks it is inappropriate so soon after her father's death. He accuses her of being cruel, and she assures him that she loves him, and is faithful ("Non mi dir" – "Tell me not").

Don Giovanni's chambers

Don Giovanni revels in the luxury of a great meal, served by Leporello, and musical entertainment during which the orchestra plays music from popular (at the time) late-18th-century operas: "O quanto un sì bel giubilo" from Vicente Martín y Soler's Una cosa rara (1786), "Come un agnello" from Giuseppe Sarti's Fra i due litiganti il terzo gode (1782), and finally "Non più andrai" from Mozart's own The Marriage of Figaro (1786). Leporello comments that he is all too familiar with the final tune – likely a joke understandable for the original audience, as Felice Ponziani, who sang Leporello's part at the premiere, also sang Figaro's part (including "Non più andrai") earlier in Prague. (Finale "Già la mensa preparata" – "Already the table is prepared"). Donna Elvira enters, saying that she no longer feels resentment against Don Giovanni, only pity for him. ("L'ultima prova dell'amor mio" – "The final proof of my love"). Don Giovanni, surprised, asks what she wants, and she begs him to change his life. Don Giovanni taunts her and then turns away, praising wine and women as the "support and glory of humankind" (sostegno e gloria d'umanità). Hurt and angry, Donna Elvira gives up and leaves. Offstage, she screams in sudden terror. Don Giovanni orders Leporello to see what has upset her; when he does, he also cries out, and runs back into the room, stammering that the statue has appeared as promised. An ominous knocking sounds at the door. Leporello, paralyzed by fear, cannot answer it, so Don Giovanni opens it himself, revealing the statue of the Commendatore. With the rhythmic chords of the overture, now reharmonized with diabolic diminished sevenths accompanying the Commendatore ("Don Giovanni! A cenar teco m'invitasti" – "Don Giovanni! You invited me to dine with you"), the statue asks if Don Giovanni will now accept his invitation to dinner. Don Giovanni brazenly accepts, and shakes the statue's proffered hand, only to collapse as he is overcome by sudden chills. The statue offers him a final chance to repent as death draws near, but Don Giovanni adamantly refuses. The statue disappears and Don Giovanni cries out in pain and terror as he is surrounded by a chorus of demons, who carry him down to Hell. Leporello, watching from under the table, also cries out in fear.

Donna Anna, Don Ottavio, Donna Elvira, Zerlina, and Masetto arrive, searching for the villain. They find instead Leporello hiding under the table, shaken by the supernatural horror he has witnessed. He assures them that no one will ever see Don Giovanni again. The remaining characters announce their plans for the future: Donna Anna and Don Ottavio will marry when Donna Anna's year of mourning is over; Donna Elvira will withdraw from society for the rest of her life; Zerlina and Masetto will finally go home for dinner; and Leporello will go to the tavern to find a better master.

The concluding ensemble delivers the moral of the opera – "Such is the end of the evildoer: the death of a sinner always reflects his life" (Questo è il fin di chi fa mal, e de' perfidi la morte alla vita è sempre ugual). As mentioned above, productions for over a century – beginning with the original run in Prague – customarily omitted the final ensemble, but it frequently reappeared in the 20th century and productions of the opera now usually include it. The return to D major and the innocent simplicity of the last few bars conclude the opera.

Recordings 

Paul Czinner directed a filming of the Salzburg Festival presentation in 1954. A screen adaptation was directed by Joseph Losey in 1979.

Cultural influence 

The Danish philosopher Søren Kierkegaard wrote a long essay in his book Enten – Eller in which he argues, writing under the pseudonym of his character "A", that "among all classic works Don Giovanni stands highest." Charles Gounod wrote that Mozart's Don Giovanni is "a work without blemish, of uninterrupted perfection." The finale, in which Don Giovanni refuses to repent, has been a captivating philosophical and artistic topic for many writers including George Bernard Shaw, who in Man and Superman parodied the opera (with explicit mention of the Mozart score for the finale scene between the Commendatore and Don Giovanni). Gustave Flaubert called Don Giovanni, along with Hamlet and the sea, "the three finest things God ever made." E. T. A. Hoffmann also wrote a short story derived from the opera, "Don Juan", in which the narrator meets Donna Anna and describes Don Juan as an aesthetic hero rebelling against God and society.

In some Germanic and other languages, Leporello's "Catalogue Aria" provided the name " list" for concertina-folded printed matter, as used for brochures, photo albums, computer printouts and other continuous stationery.

Playwright Peter Shaffer used Don Giovanni for a pivotal plot point in his play Amadeus, a fictional biography of its composer. In it, Antonio Salieri notices how Mozart composed the opera while tortured after the death of his imposing father Leopold, and uses the information to psychologically torture Mozart even further.

Don Giovanni and other composers 
The sustained popularity of Don Giovanni has resulted in extensive borrowings and arrangements of the original. The most famous and probably the most musically substantial is the operatic fantasy, Réminiscences de Don Juan by Franz Liszt. The minuet from the finale of act 1, transcribed by Moritz Moszkowski, also makes an incongruous appearance in the manuscript of Liszt's Fantasy on Themes from Mozart's Figaro and Don Giovanni, and Sigismond Thalberg uses the same minuet, along with "", in his , Op. 42. Thalberg also included a piano arrangement of "Il mio tesoro" in his , Op. 70. "" also makes an appearance in the Klavierübung of Ferruccio Busoni, under the title  (Variation study after Mozart). Schumann included a piano arrangement of "Vedrai carino" in his , which was originally intended for his Album for the Young. Chopin wrote Variations on "Là ci darem la mano" (the duet between Don Giovanni and Zerlina) for piano and orchestra. Beethoven and Danzi also wrote variations on the same theme. And Beethoven, in his Diabelli Variations, cites Leporello's aria "" in variation 22. Franz Xaver Wolfgang Mozart used minuet from the finale to act 1 ("Signor, guardate un poco") for his "" for piano Op. 2, and János Fusz used the same theme for a set of variations for four hands (Op. 10). The turkeys in Chabrier's "Ballade des gros dindons" (1889) finish each verse imitating the mandolin accompaniment of the Serenade.

Pyotr Ilyich Tchaikovsky always regarded Don Giovanni – and its composer – with awe. In 1855, Mozart's original manuscript had been purchased in London by the mezzo-soprano Pauline Viardot, who was the teacher of Tchaikovsky's one-time unofficial fiancée Désirée Artôt (whom Viardot may have persuaded not to go through with her plan to marry the composer). Viardot kept the manuscript in a shrine in her Paris home, where it was visited by many people. Tchaikovsky visited her when he was in Paris in June 1886, and said that when looking at the manuscript, he was "in the presence of divinity". So it is not surprising that the centenary of the opera in 1887 would inspire him to write something honouring Mozart. Instead of taking any themes from Don Giovanni, however, he took four lesser known works by Mozart and arranged them into his fourth orchestral suite, which he called Mozartiana. The baritone who sang the title role in the centenary performance of Don Giovanni in Prague that year was Mariano Padilla y Ramos, the man Désirée Artôt married instead of Tchaikovsky.

Michael Nyman's popular, short band piece In Re Don Giovanni (1981, with later adaptations and revisions) is constructed on a prominent 15-bar phrase in the accompaniment to Leporello's catalogue aria.

In addition to instrumental works, allusions to Don Giovanni also appear in a number of operas: Nicklausse of Offenbach's The Tales of Hoffmann sings a snatch of Leporello's "", and Rossini quotes from the same aria in the duettino between Selim and Fiorilla following the former's cavatina in act 1 of Il turco in Italia.

Ramón Carnicer's opera  (1822) is a peculiar reworking of Mozart's opera to adapt it to Rossinian fashion. It comprises new music by Carnicer on a new text (e.g. the first half of act 1), new music on Da Ponte's text (e.g. Leporello's aria) or on a mixture of both (e.g. the new trio for the scene in the cemetery); the whole collated with extensive quotations or entire sections borrowed directly from Mozart (e.g. Finale 1 and Finale 2, and even some music from Le nozze di Figaro), though usually slightly reworked and re-orchestrated.

See also 

 List of operas by Mozart

Notes and references 
Notes

References

Sources

Further reading
 Allanbrook, W. J. (1983). Rhythmic Gesture in Mozart: Le nozze di Figaro and Don Giovanni Chicago. (reviewed in Platoff, John. "Untitled." The Journal of Musicology, vol. 4, no. 4 (1986). pp. 535–538).
 Baker, Even A. (1993): Alfred Roller's Production Of Mozart's Don Giovanni – A Break in the Scenic Traditions of the Vienna Court Opera. New York University.
 Baker, Felicity (2021) (edited by Magnus Tessing Schneider). Don Giovanni's Reasons: Thoughts on a masterpiece. Bern: Peter Lang.
 Da Ponte, Lorenzo. Mozart's Don Giovanni. Dover Publications, New York, 1985. (reviewed in G. S. "Untitled." Music & Letters, vol 19, no. 2 (April 1938). pp. 216–218)
 Goehr, Lydia; Herwitz, Daniel A. (2006). The Don Giovanni Moment: Essays on the Legacy of an Opera. Columbia Press University, New York.
 Kaminsky, Peter (1996). "How to Do things with Words and Music: Towards an Analysis of Selected ensembles in Mozart's Don Giovanni." Theory and Practice
 Melitz, Leo (1921): The Opera Goer's Complete Guide

 ; reprinted in Theatre Research viii (1973), 60–74 and in 
 Rushton, Julian G. (1981). W. A. Mozart: Don Giovanni" Cambridge. (reviewed in Sternfeld, F. W. "Untitled." Music & Letters, vol. 65, no. 4 (October 1984) pp. 377–378)
 Schneider, Magnus Tessing (2021). The Original Portrayal of Mozart's Don Giovanni. Abingdon and New York: Routledge. OPEN ACCESS
 Schünemann, Georg and Soldan, Kurt (translated by Stanley Appelbaum) Don Giovanni: Complete orchestral and vocal score Dover 1974
 Tyson, Alan. "Some Features of the Autograph Score of Don Giovanni", Israel Studies in Musicology (1990), 7–26

External links 

 
 Libretto, critical edition, diplomatic edition, source evaluation (German only), links to online DME recordings; Digital Mozart Edition
 
 Opera Guide Synopsis (4 languages), libretto (German, English, Italian), highlights
 Opera in a nutshell Soundfiles (MIDI)
 Piano/vocal score of Don Giovanni from Indiana University Bloomington
 Synopsis and libretto  from Naxos Records
 Libretto, Italian, English
 Roles, arias, libretto (Italian, English)
 San Diego OperaTalk! with Nick Reveles: Don Giovanni
  Don Giovanni , production photos, synopsis 
 Portrait of the opera in the online opera guide www.opera-inside.com
 Don juan: opera en quatre actes, French, digitized on archive.org

 
Italian-language operas
Drammi giocosi
Operas by Wolfgang Amadeus Mozart
1787 operas
Operas
Operas set in Spain
Works based on the Don Juan legend
Operas adapted into films